Alderton Hill Quarry is a  geological Site of Special Scientific Interest in Gloucestershire, notified in 1997.  It is a Geological Conservation Review (GCR) site.

Location and geology
The site is located on Alderton Hill to the south west of Dumbleton Wood, approximately 2 kilometres south west of Dumbleton village which is in north Gloucestershire.

The site is a significant location for research because of its well preserved Lower Jurassic insect fauna. There is a range of publications which detail the findings on this site, which include fossil insects.  Particular findings are specimens of dragonflies (Gomphites) and a large cockroach.  Fish remains have been found, and well-preserved cephalopods. The strata exposed are part of the Whitby Mudstone.

The discoveries are usually more complete than those from comparable localities. This is an important paleoentomological locality for research into the anatomy and evolution of early insect faunas.

The site is located in hedges which are species-rich.  They include ash, oak, holly, hawthorn, hazel and spindle. The common blue butterfly is recorded.

References

SSSI Source
 Natural England SSSI information on the citation
 Natural England SSSI information on the Alderton Hill Quarry unit

External links
 Natural England (SSSI information)

Sites of Special Scientific Interest in Gloucestershire
Sites of Special Scientific Interest notified in 1997
Quarries in Gloucestershire